Atromentic acid is a red-organge pigment found in fungi within the Boletales group. It is the precursor to variegatic acid and xerocomic acid, and is preceded by atromentin. As an example, it is isolated from Serpula lacrymans. It is soluble in methanol. Variants include homoatromentic acid. This pigment has been studied and elucidated by Wolfgang Steglich and colleagues over decades.
When atromentin is oxidised with hydrogen peroxide a yellow product is produced. A sodium hydroxide solution is also yellow, but when this is neutralized with acid the red atromentic acid crystallises. Concentrated potassium hydroxide breaks up the compound to p-hydroxyphenylacetic acid and oxalic acid.

References

Carboxylic acids
Triols
Furanones
Phenols
Heterocyclic compounds with 3 rings